The 2015 International GT Open season was the tenth season of the International GT Open, the grand tourer-style sports car racing founded in 2006 by the Spanish GT Sport Organización. It began on 26 April at Circuit Paul Ricard and finished on 1 November, at Barcelona after seven double-header meetings.

The series changed tyre supplier from Dunlop to Michelin.

Entry list

Race calendar and results
 A seven-round provisional calendar was revealed on 5 November 2014.

References

External links
 

International GT Open
International GT Open seasons